SBVC may refer to:

 San Bernardino Valley College, a public community college in San Bernardino, California
 SBVC, the ICAO code for Glauber Rocha Airport, Vitória da Conquista, Brazil